Izyayu is an urban locality (an urban-type settlement) under the administrative jurisdiction of the town of republic significance of Pechora in the Komi Republic, Russia. As of the 2010 Census, its population was 1,323.

History
Urban-type settlement status was granted to Izyayu in 1981.

Administrative and municipal status
Within the framework of administrative divisions, the urban-type settlement of Izyayu is subordinated to Kozhva Urban-Type Settlement Administrative Territory, which is in turn subordinated to the town of republic significance of Pechora. Within the framework of municipal divisions, Izyayu is a part of Kozhva Urban Settlement in Pechora Municipal District.

References

Notes

Sources

Urban-type settlements in the Komi Republic